Les Halles ('The Halls') was Paris' central fresh food market. It last operated on January 12, 1973, after which it was "left to the demolition men who will knock down the last three of the eight iron-and-glass pavilions" and replaced by an underground shopping centre. The hugely unsuccessful and unpopular 1960s modern development together with the unattractive 1980s modern garden on top of it, was demolished yet again in 2010, and replaced by the Westfield Forum des Halles, a modern shopping mall built largely underground and directly connected to the massive RER and métro transit hub of Châtelet–Les Halles. The shopping mall welcomes  visitors daily.

A major reconstruction of the mall was undertaken in 2010, and the new version of the Forum des Halles was inaugurated in 2018. The 2.5 hectare Canopy was opened on 5 April 2016. In 2017, the Forum des Halles was the second most visited shopping mall in the Paris region with 42 million yearly visitors.

History

The market of the Little Fields
In the 11th century, a market grew up by a cemetery to the northwest of Paris in an area called the Little Fields. This was mainly a dry goods and money changing market. A bishop briefly took control of the market before sharing control with Louis VI in 1137. In 1183, Philip Augustus took full control of the market and built two market halls —  — to protect the textiles. He also built walls around the market, including land which had recently been confiscated from exiled Jews that originally belonged to the church. When he then built walls around the city, these embraced the market, which quickly became the city's largest (and, over time, went from being at the edge of the city to at its center). Officially, it would remain a dry goods market for centuries, but food stalls soon grew up around the main buildings and by the 15th century food prices at les Halles were being cited as significant for the whole city.

The market would have ups and downs over the coming centuries and was rebuilt more than once. Over time, an increasing number of halls were built explicitly for food, but the dry goods market remained central to the (increasingly cramped) space.

The wholesale market
The church of Saint-Eustache was constructed in the 16th century. The circular Halle aux Blés (Corn Exchange), designed by Nicolas Le Camus de Mézières, was built between 1763 and 1769 at the west end of Les Halles. Its circular central court was later covered with a dome, and it was converted into the Bourse de Commerce in 1889.

In the 1850s, Victor Baltard designed the famous glass and iron structure which would house les Halles for over a century and became one of the sights of Paris; this would last until the 1970s. Now entirely a food market, the remodeled market was known as the "Belly of Paris", as Émile Zola called it in his novel Le Ventre de Paris, which is set in the busy marketplace of the 19th century.

Major conversion
Unable to compete in the new market economy and in need of massive repairs, the colourful ambience once associated with the bustling area of merchant stalls disappeared in 1973, when Les Halles was demolished (fruit, flower and vegetable markets had moved in 1969, and only the butchers at the meat markets remained); the wholesale market was relocated to the suburb of Rungis. Two of the glass and cast iron market pavilions were dismantled and re-erected elsewhere; one in the Paris suburb of Nogent-sur-Marne, the other in Yokohama, Japan, and the rest were destroyed. The site was to become the point of convergence of the RER, a network of new express underground lines which was completed in the 1960s. Three lines leading out of the city to the south, east and west were to be extended and connected in a new underground station. For several years, the site of the markets was an enormous open pit, nicknamed  ( means 'hole'), regarded as an eyesore at the foot of the historic church of Saint-Eustache. Construction was completed in 1977 on Châtelet–Les-Halles, Paris's new urban railway hub.

The , a partially underground multiple story commercial and shopping centre, designed by Claude Vasconi and Georges Pencreac'h, opened at the east end of the site on September 4, 1979 in presence of the Mayor of Paris Jacques Chirac, and was dubbed "the hole of Les Halles", and is considered one of the worst acts of urban vandalism in the 20th century. A public garden covering  opened in 1986. Many of the surrounding streets were pedestrianized, and the park on the top of it became a magnet for drug dealing. The place been a national embarrassment ever since, and nearly universally reviled for its mean spirit.

Paris Les Halles

Châtelet–Les Halles is Paris's busiest rail station, serving 750,000 travelers on an average weekday. The buildings and their surroundings have been criticized for their design. In 2002 Mayor Bertrand Delanoë announced that the City of Paris would begin public consultations regarding the remodeling of the area, calling Les Halles "a soulless, architecturally bombastic concrete jungle".

A design competition for the Forum and gardens was held, with entries from Jean Nouvel, Winy Maas, David Mangin, and Rem Koolhaas. Mangin's design for the gardens, which proposed replacing the landscaped mounds and paths of the 1980s design with a simplified pattern of east-west pedestrian promenades and a large central lawn, was selected. The plan also includes extending the pedestrianized area further east to include all the streets bordering the gardens. Another competition was held for the redesign of the Forum. Ten teams submitted plans, and the proposal by Patrick Berger and Jacques Anziutti was selected in 2007. Their design includes a large undulating glass canopy which will cover the redesigned Forum. STIF and RATP began plans for the remodeling of the Châtelet-Les-Halles station in 2007, and the following year Berger and Anziutti were awarded a contract for redesign of the station.

The station redesign includes new entrances on Rue Berger, Rue Rambuteau, and Place Marguerite de Navarre, an expanded RER concourse, and improved pedestrian circulation. Construction began in 2010 on a project which includes the gardens, Forum, and station, to continue through 2016. The clients are the City of Paris, RATP, which operates the Paris Metro, and La Société Civile du Forum des Halles de Paris, which operates the Forum.

In popular culture

 Part of the actual demolition of the site is featured in the 1974 film  (Don't Touch the White Woman!), which iconoclastically restages General Custer's 'last stand' in a distinctly French context in and around the area.
"The result was a sceptical vision rather than a pure celebration."
 The open-air market and Baltard's pavilions were digitally reconstructed for the 2004 film  (A Very Long Engagement), which was set after the First World War.

References

Bibliography 
 in french : Bertrand Lemoine, Les Halles de Paris : L'histoire d'un lieu, les péripéties d'une reconstruction, la succession des projets, l'architecture d'un monument, l'enjeu d'une cité, L'Équerre, coll. « Les Laboratoires de l'imaginaire » (no 1), Paris, 283 p. ; in italian: Le Halles di Parigi: La storia di un luogo, le peripezie della ricostruzione, la successione dei progetti, l'architettura di un monumento, trad. Giuliana Aldi Pompili, Jaca Book, coll. « Di fronte e attraverso / Saggi di Architettura » (no 96), Milan, 1984

External links

 
  Châtelet-Les Halles on Insecula
  Remodeling project official site
  historic photos from Les Halles via the Cremerie de Paris
 Les halles Baltard  postcards from the 1900s.

11th-century establishments in France
Food markets
Districts of Paris
Buildings and structures in the 1st arrondissement of Paris
Shopping districts and streets in France
Philip II of France